Malek Jaziri was the defending champion but was defeated in the second round by Henri Laaksonen.
Marc Gicquel won the title, defeating Matthias Bachinger 3–6, 6–3, 6–4 in the final.

Seeds

Draw

Finals

Top half

Bottom half

References
 Main Draw
 Qualifying Draw

Geneva Open Challenger - Singles
2012 Singles